Stuart Hockly (born 9 April 1973) is a South African cricketer. He played in three first-class matches for Boland in 1994/95.

See also
 List of Boland representative cricketers

References

External links
 

1973 births
Living people
South African cricketers
Boland cricketers
People from Empangeni